Sitka National Cemetery is a United States National Cemetery located in the city of Sitka, Alaska. It encompasses , and as of the end of 2005 had 1,049 interments. It is administered as part of the Fort Richardson National Cemetery by the United States Department of Veterans Affairs.

History 
Laid out by General Jefferson C. Davis, at some point between 1868 and 1870 during his time as the first commander of the Department of Alaska, as a place to inter military personnel who died while serving at the local Marine base or were under care at the Naval hospital. In 1912, the military withdrew from the area and the cemetery was neglected until 1921 when the Sitka American Legion petitioned the Secretary of the Navy for an allocation of funds to maintain the site.

In 1924, President Calvin Coolidge gave an executive order declaring the site a National Cemetery, and the maintenance responsibility was turned over to the United States Department of War. A 1925 revision of the executive order reduced the area of the site, but donations of land in 1957, 1959, and in the mid 1980s made it larger than it was originally.

The cemetery was enlisted as a historic district in the National Register of Historic Places in 2012.

Notable monuments 
 There are two cannons that serves as a memorial to all those who are interred at the cemetery.

Notable interments 
 John Green Brady, governor of the Territory of Alaska from 1897 to 1906.
 Captain Charles William Paddock, Olympic gold and silver medalist from the 1920, 1924, and 1928 Olympics.
 Staff Sergeant Archie Van Winkle, Medal of Honor recipient for action in the Korean War.  (Cenotaph – his remains were cremated and scattered at sea.)

See also 
 List of cemeteries in Alaska
 National Register of Historic Places listings in Sitka City and Borough, Alaska

References

External links 

 National Cemetery Administration
 
 
 

Historic districts on the National Register of Historic Places in Alaska
Buildings and structures in Sitka, Alaska
United States national cemeteries
Protected areas of Sitka, Alaska
Cemeteries on the National Register of Historic Places in Alaska
Historic American Landscapes Survey in Alaska
1870 establishments in Alaska
Buildings and structures on the National Register of Historic Places in Sitka, Alaska
Cemeteries established in the 1870s